Waterloo Region District School Board (WRDSB, known as English-language Public District School Board No. 24 prior to 1999) is the public school board for the Region of Waterloo in Ontario, Canada. It operates 105 elementary schools, 16 secondary schools, and other facilities, serving more than 64,000 students in the Region of Waterloo. It has approximately 6,800 staff and a budget of $675 million.  It is the largest public sector employer in the Region and the second-largest employer overall. In early 2018, the director of education is John Bryant.

The board serves Waterloo Region, which consists of the cities of Kitchener, Cambridge, and Waterloo, and the townships of
Wellesley, Woolwich, Wilmot, and North Dumfries. Within the townships, WRDSB operates schools in the communities of Ayr, Baden, Breslau, Conestogo, Elmira, Floradale, Linwood, New Dundee, New Hamburg, St. Jacobs, and Wellesley.

Trustees are elected every four years by the public school ratepayers in their area.  Four trustees are elected in Kitchener, three trustees are elected in each of Waterloo/Wilmot and Cambridge/North Dumfries and one trustee represents Elmira/Woolwich.  Although trustees are elected in specific areas, once they are elected they must represent the entire region.  Annually, two students are elected by their peers to represent the student voice on the school board.  They have a voice at the table but no binding vote.  Every year in December, the trustees elect a chair and vice-chair for the coming year.  Board policy dictates that no one may serve in either role for more than two consecutive years. In 2016, the trustees published a new Strategic Plan consisting of three priorities to provide "first-class public education to Waterloo Region".

In January 2018, the Board announced that it was considering the building of up to 12 new schools and the expansion of 11 existing facilities over the subsequent years, due to an increasing population. An additional 7,100 new students were expected by 2027. At the same time, the Board was considering a study of the feasibility and benefits that might be provided by year-round schooling, but did not agree to proceed with a pilot programme. Their newest school, Oak Creek Public School, opened in September 2022.

The Waterloo Catholic District School Board operates the Catholic schools which educates approximately one of every three students in the Region.

Safe and secure schools policy
The School Board was criticized for its role in maintaining a confidential file on Ronald Wayne Archer (Ron Archer), a teacher convicted in 2000 of four charges of sexual assault on his student. The file documented allegations that Archer sexually assaulted children beginning in the 1970s. In 2006, the Ontario College of Teachers revoked Archer's certificates of qualification and registration. Members of the public believed that had the file been disclosed, subsequent abuse would have been prevented. In 2001, the Board created new policies to prevent abuse in future.

A Safe and Secure Schools policy was developed including a Code of Conduct that outlines expected behaviour standards of all members of the school community: students, parents, guardians, volunteers, staff and visitors.

In 2017 It's OK to be white posters were taped to the doors of two collegiate institutes. A spokesman for the school board said "Our schools are safe spaces. We want to see them be safe for all of our children, so to see this kind of thing emerge is a worry."

List of secondary schools
 Bluevale Collegiate Institute, Waterloo
 Cameron Heights Collegiate Institute, Kitchener
 Eastwood Collegiate Institute, Kitchener
 Elmira District Secondary School, Elmira
 Forest Heights Collegiate Institute, Kitchener
 Galt Collegiate Institute and Vocational School, Cambridge
 Glenview Park Secondary School, Cambridge
 Grand River Collegiate Institute, Kitchener
 Huron Heights Secondary School, Kitchener
 Jacob Hespeler Secondary School, Cambridge
 Kitchener-Waterloo Collegiate and Vocational School, Kitchener
 Preston High School, Cambridge
 Sir John A. Macdonald Secondary School, Waterloo
 Southwood Secondary School, Cambridge
 Waterloo Collegiate Institute, Waterloo
 Waterloo-Oxford District Secondary School, Baden

See also
List of Waterloo Region, Ontario schools
List of school districts in Ontario
List of high schools in Ontario

References

External links 
 Maps and Directions - a map of the region, with all schools marked on it.